Szentpéterfalva is the Hungarian name for several places in Romania:

Sânpetru, a commune in Brașov County
Sânpetru, a village in Sântămăria-Orlea Commune, Hunedoara County
Bozna, a town in Treznea Commune, Sălaj County